The Tambov Oblast Duma is the regional parliament of Tambov Oblast, a federal subject of Russia. A total of 50 deputies are elected for five-year terms.

History
Elections to the Tambov Oblast Duma of the first convocation were held on 27 March 1994, with 30 deputies being elected, and its first meeting being held on 22 April 1994.

Elections

2016

2021

References

Tambov Oblast
Politics of Tambov Oblast